Neeyat may refer to:

 Neeyat (TV series), a 2011 Pakistani drama
 Neeyat (film), a 1980 Bollywood action romantic film